The Italian Naval Aviation is the  naval air component of the Italian Navy composed of around 2000 men and women and 69 aircraft and helicopters.

History 
It is more commonly known as Naval Aviation as it received various official designations throughout its service and its origins date back to 1913, when it was created as the air branch of the Navy. The service was then disbanded and integrated into the Italian Air Force, upon the creation of this new branch in 1937, when a law gave control of all national fixed-wing air assets to the Italian Air Force.

Having been reactivated in 1956 to operate the Navy's new shipborne helicopters entering service with the Italian frigates. The ban on fixed-wing aircraft was lifted in 1989, and the Italian Navy acquired Harrier II fighters to fly from the aircraft carrier Giuseppe Garibaldi.

In 2009, the Giuseppe Garibaldi was replaced as the flagship of the Italian navy by the new and larger aircraft carrier Cavour.

Organisation 
The units of the Italian Naval Aviation are based at three civil airports. A small detachment is based at the Italian Air Force's the Pratica di Mare Air Base.

 Air Forces Command (Comando delle Forze Aeree - COMFORAER), in Rome
 Aerial Section (Sezione Aerea - SEZAER), at Pratica di Mare Air Base with 3x P.180 Maritime liaison planes
 Naval Aircraft Station (Stazione Aeromobili della Marina Militare - MARISTAER), at Taranto-Grottaglie Airport
 Carrier Air Group (Gruppo Aerei Imbarcati - GRUPAER)
 Operations Unit (Reparto Operazioni) with AV-8B+ Harrier II fighters (being replaced by F-35B Lightning II)
 Operational Support Unit (Reparto Supporto Operativo)
 Operational Informations Unit (Reparto Informazioni Operative)
 4th Helicopter Group (Quarto Gruppo Elicotteri - GRUPELICOT QUATTRO)
 Operations Unit (Reparto Operazioni) with SH-90A ASuW/ASW helicopters and Camcopter S-100 unmanned aerial vehicles
 Training Unit (Reparto Addestramento) with SH-90A ASuW/ASW helicopters
 Operational Support Unit (Reparto Supporto Operativo)
 Operational Informations Unit (Reparto Informazioni Operative)
 Naval Helicopter Station Luni (Stazione Elicotteri della Marina Militare Luni - MARISTAELI Luni), at Sarzana-Luni Airport
 1st Helicopter Group (Primo Gruppo Elicotteri - GRUPELICOT UNO)
 Helicopter Assault Unit (Reparto Eliassalto) with MH-101A transport helicopters supporting COMSUBIN
 ASuW/ASW/EW Unit (Reparto AWW/ASW/EW) with EH-101A HEW helicopters
 Operational Support Unit (Reparto Supporto Operativo)
 Operational Informations Unit (Reparto Informazioni Operative)
 5th Helicopter Group (Quinto Gruppo Elicotteri - GRUPELICOT CINQUE)
 Helicopter Assault Unit (Reparto Eliassalto) with MH-90A tactical transport helicopters supporting COMSUBIN
 ASuW/ASW Unit (Reparto AWW/ASW) with SH-90A ASuW/ASW helicopters
 Operational Support Unit (Reparto Supporto Operativo)
 Operational Informations Unit (Reparto Informazioni Operative)
 Naval Helicopter Station Catania (Stazione Elicotteri della Marina Militare Catania - MARISTAELI Catania), at Catania–Fontanarossa Airport
 2nd Helicopter Group (Secondo Gruppo Elicotteri - GRUPELICOT DUE)
 Operations Unit (Reparto Operazioni) with SH-90A ASuW/ASW helicopters
 Operational Support Unit (Reparto Supporto Operativo)
 Operational Informations Unit (Reparto Informazioni Operative)
 3rd Helicopter Group (Terzo Gruppo Elicotteri - GRUPELICOT TRE)
 Operations Unit (Reparto Operazioni) with SH-101A ASuW/ASW helicopters
 Training Unit (Reparto Addestramento) with SH-101A ASuW/ASW helicopters
 Operational Support Unit (Reparto Supporto Operativo)
 Operational Informations Unit (Reparto Informazioni Operative)

Aircraft

References

Bibliography 
 

Marina Militare
Naval aviation services
Aviation in Italy